This is a list of operas by the German composer Johann Adam Hiller (1728–1804).

List

References
Sources
Bauman, Thomas (1992), 'Hiller, Johann Adam' in The New Grove Dictionary of Opera, ed. Stanley Sadie (London) 

 
Lists of operas by composer
Lists of compositions by composer